Maja Göthberg (born 16 July 1997) is a Swedish footballer midfielder who plays for Kungsbacka DFF.

External links 
Sweden U19
Winner
 UEFA Women's Under-19 Championship: 2015

External links 
 

1997 births
Living people
Swedish women's footballers
BK Häcken FF players
Kungsbacka DFF players
Damallsvenskan players
Women's association football midfielders
Sundsvalls DFF players
Elitettan players